Brigadier General Phyo Thant is a Burmese military officer and incumbent deputy minister for border affairs of Myanmar. He previously served as the commander of the Northwestern Regional Command.

Career
Phyo Thant graduated from the 23rd intake of the Officers Training School. He served as the division commander of Military Operation Command No. 4 under Yangon Regional Command until he was promoted to Northwestern Regional Command after the 2021 Myanmar coup d'état. 
It is rumored that soon after his appointment, the military regime detained and interrogated him for his plan to defect and take refuge in an ethnically controlled area. He is said to be became the highest-ranking regime official so far to switch allegiance to the Civil Disobedience Movement (CDM) against the junta and the high-ranking officer to be arrested. The local media reported that he died during the interrogation. According to a recent source, he denied the rumors and stated that they were false. The reason for his arrest was his poor performance following heavy losses against resistance fighters in the Chin State and Sagaing Region.

In January 2022, he was removed from the role of commander after hundreds of soldiers under his command were killed by opposition fighters. After he was removed, Lieutenant General Than Hlaing took over in the interim. He was appointed the deputy minister for border affairs.

See also 

 2021 Myanmar coup d'état
 State Administration Council
 Tatmadaw

References 

Living people
Burmese generals
Officers Training School, Bahtoo alumni
Year of birth missing (living people)